"Hells Bells" is the first track of Back in Black, the seventh studio album by Australian hard rock band AC/DC and their comeback album after the death of lead singer Bon Scott. "Hells Bells" is the second single from Back in Black, released on 31 October 1980. The song also appears on Who Made Who, AC/DC's 1986 soundtrack to the Stephen King film Maximum Overdrive and on both versions of 1992's AC/DC Live.

Composition
"Hells Bells" begins with the slow, funereal tolling of a  bronze bell. Manufactured by John Taylor & Co Bellfounders in Loughborough, the sound of the bell was recorded by Tony Platt using Ronnie Lane's mobile studio inside the bell foundry following the completion of the Back in Black tracking sessions at Compass Point Studios in the Bahamas.

Reception
"Hells Bells" is widely regarded as one of the band's best songs. In 2020, The Guardian ranked the song number six on their list of the 40 greatest AC/DC songs, and in 2021, Kerrang! ranked the song number seven on their list of the 20 greatest AC/DC songs.

Charts

Certifications

Use in sports
"Hells Bells" was used as the entrance music for former Major League Baseball (MLB) player Trevor Hoffman at home games from 1998 to 2010.

The song is played prior to every New Jersey Devils home game as the players come out on the ice.

The German football club FC St. Pauli from Hamburg and French rugby club RC Toulonnais from Toulon open all home matches walking out to "Hells Bells", the former often with large fan displays and pyrotechnics.

During the Bells Beach surf competition in Victoria, Australia, "Hells Bells" is played on the loudspeakers at the beginning of the first heat of each competing day.

References

1980 singles
1980 songs
AC/DC songs
Atlantic Records singles
Song recordings produced by Robert John "Mutt" Lange
Songs written by Brian Johnson
Songs written by Angus Young
Songs written by Malcolm Young